Bermúdez is a 2009 Colombian telenovela produced and broadcast by Caracol TV. It was initially released as Todas odian a Bermúdez ("All women hate Bermúdez").

Plot
The telenovela tells the story of Arturo Bermúdez (Víctor Hugo Cabrera), a sports journalist who works for Hechos, a Bogotá-based weekly current issues news magazine. Bermúdez, who excels as a journalist, nevertheless is regarded as an annoying person, who tends to make disrespectful remarks and jokes, especially toward women. The former editor-in-chief of the magazine quit because of Bermúdez's behaviour.

Hechos'''s owner, Gonzalo Lleras (Diego Bertie), who returns to Colombia in order to run his businesses, appoints Silvia Vargas (Valentina Rendón) —at the moment editor-in-chief of an evening newspaper— as the new publisher of the magazine. Both Lleras and Vargas are college classmates of Bermúdez, who jokingly refers to Silvia as cuatrolámparas ("four-lamps", because Silvia used to wear glasses during her college years).

Bermúdez, who thought he would become the new editor-in-chief of the magazine as he was friends with then publisher Aníbal Fernández (Alberto León Jaramillo), is transferred by Silvia from the sports section to the "home and women's issues" section instead, as a punishment for an article by Bermúdez published on the magazine during Aníbal's tenure, criticizing the role of women in the Police, responsible for security at football stadia during matches (incidentally, Silvia's older sister, Lina, a police official, was harshly criticized by Arturo in the article), which prompted a backlash among readers and advertisers. Silvia makes Bermúdez rectify the article. Therefore, he is decided to not allow Silvia to "humiliate" him, trying to make Silvia feel bad or angry, with little success. Instead, Vargas ends up helping Bermúdez when he needs it.

Unknowingly, Silvia and Arturo have a friendship via internet. On night hours, they chat using the nicks Solitaria and Solitario respectively (both meaning "lonely"). Their anonymity allows them to pour out and support honestly each other, unlike real life.

Silvia has a crush on Gonzalo, whom he calls in secret the jefe papito, because of his looks and apparent gentlemanliness. On the other hand, since college Bermúdez has had a crush on Lucía Congote (Andrea Nocetti), who works at a television network owned by her family, and Gonzalo's ex-girlfriend. Lucía uses Bermúdez in order to upset Silvia, whom she hates (referring to her disrespectfully as Gatúbela, Batichica or Mujer maravilla), blaming her for "stealing" Gonzalo's love.

Cast
Apart from the four main characters, there have been some inconsistencies regarding the other characters' last names, between the initial press releases and related promotional material issued by Caracol TV to the media<ref name="elpaiscali"> Sergio Villamizar D., Colprensa, Todos quieren a Víctor Hugo, El País (Colombia), 2 February 2009</ref> and the actual broadcast of the telenovela. In one episode, outgoing Hechos publisher Aníbal introduces most of the staff to his successor, Silvia. The most notorious case is Luz Adriana ("Archila" as for the press releases, "Giraldo" as for episode 3, "Jiménez" as mentioned by Gerardo Bermúdez in another episode). .

Víctor Hugo Cabrera as Arturo Bermúdez
Valentina Rendón as Silvia Vargas
Diego Bertie as Gonzalo Lleras
Andrea Nocetti as Lucía Congote
Isabel Cristina Estrada as Paola Ramírez / Paola Rincón (Silvia's best friend, journalist)
Cecilia Navia as Luz Adriana Archila / Luz Adriana Giraldo / Luz Adriana Jiménez (journalist, appointed editor-in-chief by Silvia)
Carlos Barbosa as Gerardo Bermúdez (Arturo's father)
Consuelo Moure as Lola Ortiz de Vargas / Lola Angarita de Vargas (Silvia's mother)
Claudia Liliana González as Captain Lina Vargas (Silvia's older sister, police official; referred to as Carmenza in promotional material, not in actual broadcast)
Andrés Felipe Martínez as Rodrigo Mejía (Arturo's best friend, sales chief)
María Angélica Mallarino as Olga Guerrero (journalist, international editor, former teacher of Silvia)
Ana María Arango as Marinita González
Carmenza Cossio as Albita (Silvia's secretary)
Claudio Cataño as Diego Medina (Lucía's best friend, photojournalist)
María Isabel Henao as Ana Fernanda Ramírez (journalist, national and economy editor)
Manolo Orjuela as Manuel Aguilar (journalist, art-and-design editor)
Natalia Reyes as Marcela Delgado (from episode 18)
Néstor Alfonso Rojas as Yiyo (moneylender, Gerardo Bermúdez gets intro trouble with him)
Gloria Echeverry as Stella (Gonzalo Lleras's secretary)
Kepa Amuchastegui as Lorenzo Castillo (university law professor, love interest of Lola)
María Cecilia Botero as Cecilia Arbeláez de Lleras (Gonzalo's mother, from episode 81)
Taliana Vargas as Robin Arzuaga (executive from a Spaniard publishing company)
María Claudia Torres as Astrid (until episode 15)
Alberto León Jaramillo as Aníbal Fernández (until episode 4)
Marion Zapata as an unnamed personal trainer (episodes 75 to 78)
Mauricio Sarmiento as Danilo Tocarruncho (episodes 77 and 78)
Andrés Martínez as Manuel Albornoz, aka Manueca (boss of a thief gang, helps Silvia to get a gift for Arturo, involved with a politician, from episode 81)

Episodes
Only the first 2 episodes were around 1 hour long. From episode 3 onwards, episodes last around half hour. It must be noticed that, since the telenovela is being broadcast in Colombia with half hour or even shorter episodes, the numbering has no relation with the 80 hours produced.

Source:

Reception
Though its first episode was the most watched programme in the Colombian primetime on 2 February 2009, ratings declined because Todas odian a Bermúdez was competing against El último matrimonio feliz, rival network RCN TV strongest telenovela at the time. Caracol TV removed the "todas odian a" from the title and Bermúdez was moved to a time slot later in the night, with shorter episodes. Ratings slowly improved, but RCN TV's own ratings crisis before and after El último matrimonio feliz ended 22 April 2009 and Caracol TV's primetime overall performance helped Bermúdez to stay on the air (whereas rival RCN TV pulled or cut most of its shows premiered in the first quarter of 2009).

In April 2009, El Tiempo claimed Bermúdez had been cut from 120 to 80 one-hour episodes and that tapings would end by mid-April. On the L.A. Screenings 2009, held late May in Los Angeles, Bermúdez was introduced as an 80 episode serial.

Diego Bertie told a Peruvian newspaper that Bermúdez was cut from 120 to 100 episodes, stating that "competition is very hard [in Colombia]." Ana María Arango told El Tiempo she was "sad" it was cut because the character she was playing did not become a journalist "as the scripts stated". As of 14 May 2009, Bermúdez ratings were higher that any programme broadcast by RCN TV in primetime.

The end 

On early August 2009, Caracol TV advertised the last episodes of Bermúdez, though the plot of the telenovela was not foretelling its end, because its main characters were just starting to get closer. On 17 August (a holiday in Colombia, where telenovelas are not broadcast on holidays), Caracol TV broadcast a little advertised 100 minute special. The next day, its final episode was announced for 21 August. Hundreds of viewers protested on the network's website because of the sudden end of its run, which only solved, in a fast-paced way, the situation of the main characters, leaving the stories of the other characters without conclusion. Apparently, Caracol TV needed to make room for reality show Desafío 2009 and the series Las muñecas de la mafia (at the time known as Las mujeres del cartel). In Colombia the 80 hours filmed (42 minutes plus commercials each) were not completely broadcast.

One day before the final episode was broadcast, Juliana Tabares, journalist for Doble vía (a programme of the Caracol TV defensoría del televidente [viewer ombudswoman's office]), claimed that recordings of Bermúdez had ended on 30 April and that, despite its short run, it had not been cut not having a different ending to "the one already agreed". A week later, Amparo Pérez, the network's viewer ombudswoman, recognized that "the final episodes were cut and [Bermúdez] was given a fast end where there were even edition flaws", adding that the opinions from the viewers were sent to the Caracol TV "production departament".

International broadcasting 
The telenovela has been broadcast, under the title Todas odian a Bermúdez, on Mexico (52MX), Venezuela (RCTV) and Ecuador (Teleamazonas). Unlike its original run on Caracol TV, the 80 hours produced were broadcast on their entirety in these countries.

References

External links
  Official website
  Bermúdez on the Caracol TV Internacional catalogue
  3, 2, 1, grabando, features a behind the scenes of Bermúdez and Vecinos (requires Adobe Flash Player)
  Bermúdez sale del cascarón (requires Adobe Flash Player)
 

2009 telenovelas
2009 Colombian television series debuts
2009 Colombian television series endings
Colombian telenovelas
Caracol Televisión telenovelas
Spanish-language telenovelas
Television shows set in Bogotá